Frederick Warder may refer to:
 Frederick B. Warder, United States Navy submarine officer
 Frederick L. Warder, American politician from New York